CFBT may refer to:

Campaign for Better Transport
Christian Foundation for the Blind in Thailand
CfBT Education Trust, charity in the United Kingdom
CFBT-FM, radio station in Canada
 Compartment Fire Behaviour Training, special training and techniques for interior firefighting.